Norris Lake may refer to:
 Norris Lake (Anoka County, Minnesota)
 Norris Lake (Tennessee), a Tennessee Valley Authority reservoir in Tennessee, impounded by Norris Dam
 Lake Norris in Lake County, Florida

See also
 Norris (disambiguation)